Too Late to Turn Back Now is the title of a 1977 album by the progressive bluegrass band New Grass Revival on the Flying Fish label. It was their first live album,  and was recorded at the Telluride Bluegrass Festival.

Track listing
 "Lonesome and a Long Way from Home" (Delaney Bramlett, Leon Russell) – 5:16
 "With Care from Someone" (Gene Clark, Doug Dillard, Bernie Leadon) – 8:05
 "High Lonesome Sound" (Peter Rowan) – 4:04
 "Rainbow Bridge" (Curtis Burch) – 3:39
 "Watermelon Man" (Willis Ramsey) – 4:31
 "Fly Through the Country" (Jimmy Webb) – 8:58
 "Red Man Blues" (Sam Bush, Courtney Johnson) – 9:47

Personnel
 Sam Bush - mandolin, slide mandolin, fiddle, guitar, electric mandolin, lead vocals
 John Cowan - electric bass, lead vocals
 Courtney Johnson - banjo, vocals
 Curtis Burch - guitar, Dobro, vocals

See also 

New Grass Revival albums
1977 live albums